Chrysopilus ornatus, the ornate snipe fly, is a species of snipe fly in the family Rhagionidae.

References

Rhagionidae
Articles created by Qbugbot
Insects described in 1823